Xi'an Xianyang International Airport  is the main airport serving Xi'an, Shaanxi Province, as well as the whole Guanzhong area. The airport was the hub for China Northwest Airlines until the company was merged into China Eastern Airlines in 2002. Xi'an Airport is also the hub for Joy Air and Hainan Airlines. Xi'an Xianyang International Airport is a Skytrax 4-star airport.

In 2018, the airport handled 44,650,000	passengers, making it the busiest airport in northwest China. It is the ninth busiest airport nationwide. Xi'an Xianyang International Airport was also the nation's 9th busiest airport in terms of cargo traffic and the 7th busiest airport by traffic movements.

Location
The airport is located within the administrative area of Xianyang city, which gives the airport its name.

History
Before Xianyang Airport was built, Xi'an was served by Xi'an Xiguan Airport. In 1984, the State Council of China and the Central Military Commission proposed to build a large civil airport on the site of Xianyang's airfield. Phase 1 of the airport commenced construction in August 1987, and was finished and opened on 1 September 1991. Xi'an Xiguan Airport was closed at the same time. Phase 2 started in August 2000, and was finished on 16 September 2003. Another 7.592-billion-yuan project is scheduled to be completed by 2020.

Finnair's service to Helsinki was the first intercontinental route out of Xi'an, launching on 14 June 2013. It is now a seasonal route.

Terminal 3 and second runway
Terminal 3 and the second runway were opened on 3 May 2012, increasing the airport's capacity to more than 33 million passengers a year. The new terminal alone can handle 22 million passengers a year, twice as many as the other two terminals combined. Airlines that moved into the new terminal are China Eastern Airlines, China Southern Airlines, and Shanghai Airlines. The second runway is 3,800 meters long and is large enough to handle the Airbus A380.

Airlines and destinations

Passenger

Statistics

Ground transportation
Eight airport bus routes connect the airport well with the Xi'an and Xianyang city.

There are also long-distance buses which connect the airport with Baoji, Yangling, Lintong, Hancheng, Hanzhong, Weinan, Tongchuan, Yan'an, Qingyang, and Pingliang.

Xi'an Metro Line 14 between Beikezhan (Beiguangchang) station and the airport was opened on September 29, 2019. The line extended to Heshao on June 29, 2021.

Accidents and incidents

 On 6 June 1994, China Northwest Airlines Flight 2303 broke up in mid-air and crashed near Xi'an, en route to Guangzhou from Xi'an. A maintenance error was responsible. All 160 people on board died.

See also
Xi'an Xiguan Airport
List of airports in China
List of the busiest airports in China

References

External links

 Official website
 
 

Airports in Shaanxi
Buildings and structures in Xi'an
Transport in Xi'an
Airports established in 1991
1991 establishments in China
Xianyang